Cuvierinidae is a family of gastropods belonging to the order Pteropoda. 

Genera:
 Cuvierina Boas, 1886
 †Ireneia Janssen, 1995
 † Johnjagtia A. W. Janssen, 2005 
 † Spoelia A. W. Janssen, 1990 
Taxon inquirendum
 Triptera Quoy & Gaimard, 1835
Synonyms
 Cuvieria Rang, 1827: synonym of Cuvierina Boas, 1886 (invalid: junior homonym of Cuvieria Lesueur & Petit, 1807; Herse, Hyperia, Cuvierina and Rangistela are replacement names)
 Herse Gistel, 1848: synonym of Cuvierina Boas, 1886 (substitute name for Cuvieria Rang, 1827; invalid: junior homonym of Herse Hawle & Corda, 1847 [Trilobita])
 Hyperia Gistel, 1848: synonym of Cuvierina Boas, 1886 (Invalid: junior homonym of Hyperia Latreille, 1829 [Crustacea])
 Rangistela Pruvot-Fol, 1948: synonym of Cuvierina Boas, 1886
 Tripteris [sic]: synonym of Cuvierina Boas, 1886

References

Pteropoda
Gastropod families